KZJW-LD was a low power digital television station planned to be constructed to operate entirely from solar and/or wind power.  On October 7, 2009, the Federal Communications Commission issued a public notice announcing that it proposed to grant a construction permit (BNPDTL-20090825ABV) to James Edwin Whedbee, M.Ed., for this station.  The station was to be built and operated from Bledsoe, Cochran County, Texas with an effective radiated power of 1.3 kilowatts.  Originally issued the call sign K23KE-D, it was changed to KZJW-LD on December 15, 2009. The station surrendered its permit on January 3, 2013.

References

External links
 Federal Communications Commission, Media Bureau, K23KE-D

Television stations in Texas